Cyrus Roberts Vance Sr. (March 27, 1917January 12, 2002) was an American lawyer and United States Secretary of State under President Jimmy Carter from 1977 to 1980. Prior to serving in that position, he was the United States Deputy Secretary of Defense in the Johnson administration. During the Kennedy administration he was Secretary of the Army and General Counsel of the Department of Defense.

As Secretary of State, Vance approached foreign policy with an emphasis on negotiation over conflict and a special interest in arms reduction. In April 1980, he resigned in protest of Operation Eagle Claw, the secret mission to rescue American hostages in Iran. He was succeeded by Edmund Muskie.

Vance was the cousin (and adoptive son) of 1924 Democratic presidential nominee and lawyer John W. Davis. He was the father of Manhattan District Attorney Cyrus Vance Jr.

Early life and family
Cyrus Vance was born on March 27, 1917, in Clarksburg, West Virginia. He was the son of John Carl Vance II and his wife Amy Roberts Vance, and had an elder brother, John Carl Vance III. Following Vance's birth, his family relocated to Bronxville, New York, so that his father could commute to New York City, where he was an insurance broker. Vance's father was also a landowner and worked for a government agency during World War I. He died unexpectedly of pneumonia in 1922. 

Vance's mother was Amy Roberts Vance, who had a prominent family history in Philadelphia and was active in civic affairs. Following her husband's death, she moved her family to Switzerland for a year, where Vance and his brother learned French at L'Institut Sillig in Vevey.  Vance's much older cousin (referred to as an "uncle" within the family) John W. Davis, an Ambassador to the United Kingdom and 1924 United States presidential candidate, became his mentor and adopted him.

Vance graduated from Kent School in 1935 and earned a bachelor's degree in 1939 from Yale College, where he was a member of the secret society Scroll and Key. He also earned three varsity letters in ice hockey at Yale. He graduated from Yale Law School in 1942. While there, his classmates included Sargent Shriver, William Scranton, Stanley Rogers Resor, and William Bundy, with all of whom he would later work.

Vance entered the military during World War II, serving in the United States Navy as a gunnery officer on the destroyer USS Hale (DD-642) until 1946. He saw sea action in the Battle of Tarawa, the Battle of Saipan, the Battle of Guam (1944), the Bougainville Campaign, and the Philippines Campaign (1944–1945). After the war, he worked for the Mead Corporation for a year before joining the law firm Simpson Thacher & Bartlett in New York City.

At the age of 29, Vance married Grace Elsie "Gay" Sloane on February 15, 1947. She was a Bryn Mawr College graduate and was the daughter of the board chairman of the W. & J. Sloane furniture company in New York City. They had five children:
 Elsie Nicoll Vance
 Amy Sloane Vance
 Grace Roberts Vance
 Camilla Vance Holmes
 Cyrus R. Vance Jr.

Political career
In 1957, Senator Lyndon B. Johnson asked Vance to leave Wall Street to work for the United States Senate Committee on Armed Services, where he helped draft the National Aeronautics and Space Act, leading to the creation of NASA.

In 1961, Defense Secretary Robert McNamara recruited Vance to become General Counsel of the Department of Defense. He was then made the Secretary of the Army by President John F. Kennedy. He was Secretary when Army units were sent to northern Mississippi in 1962 to protect James Meredith and ensure that the court-ordered integration of the University of Mississippi took place.

In 1964, Vance became the United States Deputy Secretary of Defense and now-President Johnson sent him to the Panama Canal Zone after student riots. After the 1967 Detroit riot, Johnson sent him to Michigan. Vance next attempted to delay the Cyprus dispute.  In 1968, Johnson sent him to South Korea to deal with the  hostage situation.

Vance first supported the Vietnam War but by the late 1960s changed his views and resigned from office, advising the president to pull out of South Vietnam. Vance served as a deputy to W. Averell Harriman during the Paris Peace Accords, which were a failure due to the duplicity of the South Vietnamese. Vance called the failed peace talks "one of the great tragedies in history". He received the Presidential Medal of Freedom in January 1969.

In May 1970, Vance was appointed to serve as a commissioner in a landmark panel known as the Knapp Commission, which was formed and tasked by New York City Mayor John V. Lindsay with investigating systemic corruption at the New York Police Department. The Knapp Commission held televised hearings into police corruption and issued a final report of its findings in 1972. The work of the Knapp Commission led to the prosecution of police officers on charges of corruption and culminated in significant, if short-lived, reforms and oversight in respect of the police department, including the appointment of a temporary special prosecutor to investigate and prosecute corruption committed by NYPD officers, district attorneys, and judges.

From 1974 to 1976, Vance served as president of the New York City Bar Association. Vance returned to his law practice at Simpson Thacher & Bartlett in 1980, but was repeatedly called back to public service throughout the 1980s and 1990s, participating in diplomatic missions to Bosnia, Croatia, and South Africa. Vance helped negotiate the dispute over the Nagorno-Karabakh region.

Secretary of State

President Jimmy Carter initially wanted to nominate George Ball to become  Secretary of State, but, fearing Ball was too liberal to be confirmed, nominated Vance instead. Vance played an integral role as the administration negotiated the Panama Canal Treaties, along with peace talks in Rhodesia, Namibia and South Africa.  He worked closely with Israeli Ministers Moshe Dayan and Ezer Weizman to secure the Camp David Accords in 1978. Vance insisted that the President make Paul Warnke Director of the Arms Control and Disarmament Agency, over strong opposition by Senator Henry M. Jackson.

Vance also pushed for closer ties to the Soviet Union, and clashed frequently with the more hawkish National Security Advisor Zbigniew Brzezinski. Vance tried to advance arms limitations by working on the SALT II agreement with the Soviet Union, which he saw as the central diplomatic issue of the time, but Brzezinski lobbied for a tougher more assertive policy vis-a-vis the Soviets. He argued for strong condemnation of Soviet activity in Africa and in the Third World as well as successfully lobbying for normalized relations with the People's Republic of China in 1978. 

As Brzezinski took control of the negotiations, Vance was marginalized and his influence began to wane. When revolution erupted in Iran in late 1978, the two were divided on how to support the United States' ally the Shah of Iran. Vance argued in favor of reforms while Brzezinski urged him to crack down – the 'iron fist' approach. Unable to receive a direct course of action from Carter, the mixed messages that the Shah received from Vance and Brzezinski contributed to his confusion and indecision as he fled Iran in January 1979 and his regime collapsed.

Vance negotiated the SALT II agreement directly with Soviet Ambassador Anatoly Dobrynin, bypassing American Ambassador Malcolm Toon, who then criticized the agreement. In June 1979, President Carter and Soviet General Secretary Leonid Brezhnev signed the treaty in Vienna's Hofburg Imperial Palace, in front of the international press, but the Senate ultimately did not ratify it.

After the Soviet invasion of Afghanistan on December 27, 1979, Vance's opposition to what he had called "visceral anti-Sovietism" led to a rapid reduction of his stature. His attempt to surreptitiously negotiate a solution to the Iran hostage crisis with Ayatollah Ruhollah Khomeini through the Palestine Liberation Organization failed badly. Believing that diplomatic initiatives could see the hostages safely returned home, Vance initially fought off attempts by Brzezinski to pursue a military solution. Vance, struggling with gout, went to Florida on Thursday, April 10, 1980, for a long weekend. On Friday, the National Security Council held a newly scheduled meeting and authorized Operation Eagle Claw, a military expedition into Tehran to rescue the hostages. Deputy Secretary Warren Christopher, who attended the meeting in Vance's place, did not inform him.

Furious, on April 21 Vance handed in his resignation on principle, calling Brzezinski "evil". The only Secretaries of State who had previously resigned in protest were Lewis Cass, who resigned in the buildup to the Civil War, and William Jennings Bryan, who resigned in the buildup to World War I.

President Carter aborted the operation after only five of the eight helicopters he had sent into the Dasht-e Kavir desert arrived in operational condition. As U.S. forces prepared to depart from the staging area, a helicopter collided with a transport plane, causing a fire that killed eight servicemen.  Vance's resignation was confirmed several days later, and he was replaced by Senator Edmund Muskie. A second rescue mission was planned but never carried out, and the diplomatic efforts to negotiate the release of the hostages were handed over to Deputy Secretary Christopher. The hostages were released during the first inauguration of Ronald Reagan, after 444 days in captivity.

Later career in law and as Special Envoy
In 1991, he was named Special Envoy of the Secretary-General of the United Nations for Croatia and proposed the Vance plan for solution of conflict in Croatia. Authorities of Croatia and Serbia agreed to Vance's plan, but the leaders of SAO Krajina rejected it, even though it offered Serbs quite a large degree of autonomy by the rest of the world's standards, as it did not include full independence for Krajina. He continued his work as member of Zagreb 4 group. The plan they drafted, named Z-4, was effectively superseded when Croatian forces retook the Krajina region (Operation Storm) in 1995.

In January 1993, as the United Nations Special Envoy to Bosnia, Vance and Lord David Owen, the EU representative, began negotiating a peace plan for the ending the War in Bosnia. The plan was rejected, and Vance announced his resignation as Special Envoy to the UN Secretary-General. He was replaced by Norwegian Foreign Minister Thorvald Stoltenberg.

In 1997, he was made the original honorary chair of the American Iranian Council.

Later life and death
Vance was a member of both the American Academy of Arts and Sciences and the American Philosophical Society. 

In 1993, Vance was awarded the United States Military Academy's Sylvanus Thayer Award. 

In 1995 he again acted as Special Envoy of the Secretary-General of the United Nations and signed the interim accord as witness in the negotiations between the Republic of Macedonia and Greece. Vance was a member of the Trilateral Commission.  

Vance also served on the board of directors of IBM, Pan American World Airways, Manufacturers Hanover Trust, U.S. Steel, and The New York Times, as a trustee of the Yale Corporation, as chairman of the board of the Rockefeller Foundation, and vice chairman of the Council on Foreign Relations.

Vance suffered for several years from Alzheimer's disease, and died at Mount Sinai Medical Center in New York City on January 12, 2002, aged 84, of pneumonia and other complications. His funeral was held at the Church of the Heavenly Rest in Manhattan. His remains were interred at the Arlington National Cemetery in Arlington, Virginia. His wife Grace died in New York City on March 22, 2008, at the age of 89.

Legacy
He received the Presidential Medal of Freedom in 1969.

In 1980, Vance received the U.S. Senator John Heinz Award for Greatest Public Service by an Elected or Appointed Official, an award given out annually by Jefferson Awards.

He received the Freedom Medal in 1993.

The house of Vance's mother, which was known as the Stealey-Goff-Vance House, was listed on the National Register of Historic Places in 1979. It is home to the Harrison County Historical Society.

In 1999, Vance was presented the Lifetime Contributions to American Diplomacy Award by the American Foreign Service Association.

In the 2012 movie Argo, he was portrayed by actor Bob Gunton.

References

Further reading

 
 McLellan, David S. Cyrus Vance. Rowman & Littlefield, 1985. Scholarly biography.
 
 Mulcahy, Kevin V. "The secretary of State and the national security adviser: Foreign policymaking in the Carter and Reagan administrations." Presidential Studies Quarterly 16.2 (1986): 280-299.
 Rosati,  Jerel A. "Continuity and change in the foreign policy beliefs of political leaders: Addressing the controversy over the Carter administration." Political Psychology (1988): 471-505.
 Sexton, Mary DuBois. The wages of principle and power: Cyrus R. Vance and the making of foreign policy in the Carter administration (Ph.D. thesis, Georgetown University, 2009).
 Smith, Gaddis. Morality, Reason, and Power: American Diplomacy in the Carter Years (1986). 
 Wallis, Christopher. The Thinker, the Doer and the Decider: Zbigniew Brzezinski, Cyrus Vance and the Bureaucratic Wars of the Carter Administration (PhD Thesis, Northumbria University 2018).

Primary sources
 Talbott, Strobe, Endgame: The Inside Story of Salt II (New York: Harpercollins, 1979) online
 Vance, Cyrus. Hard Choices: Four Critical Years in Managing America's Foreign Policy (1983) memoir as Secretary of State. online
 "U.S. Foreign Policy: A Discussion with Former Secretaries of State Dean Rusk, William P. Rogers, Cyrus R. Vance, and Alexander M. Haig, Jr." International Studies Notes, Vol. 11, No. 1, Special Edition: The Secretaries of State, Fall 1984.  (pp. 10-20)
 Vance, Cyrus R. "The Human Rights Imperative". Foreign Policy 63 (1986): 3-19. .

External links

 
 Foreign Service Journal article on his Lifetime Contributions to American Diplomacy Award. 
 , from the Lyndon Baines Johnson Library
 Cyrus R. Vance and Grace Sloane Vance Papers, 1957-1992, held at Yale University Library, Manuscripts & Archives
 Arlington National Cemetery
 : Cartes sur table, 31 March 1980 (40 minutes)

1917 births
2002 deaths
American adoptees
American athlete-politicians
Military personnel from Clarksburg, West Virginia
United States Navy personnel of World War II
Burials at Arlington National Cemetery
Ice hockey people from West Virginia
New York (state) lawyers
Kennedy administration personnel
Kent School alumni
Lyndon B. Johnson administration personnel
Mount Holyoke College faculty
Operation Condor
Politicians from Clarksburg, West Virginia
Lawyers from New York City
People of the Iranian Revolution
Presidential Medal of Freedom recipients
United States Deputy Secretaries of Defense
United States Navy officers
United States Secretaries of State
United States Secretaries of the Army
Yale Law School alumni
Presidents of the New York City Bar Association
Deaths from dementia in New York (state)
Deaths from Alzheimer's disease
Deaths from pneumonia in New York City
Carter administration cabinet members
20th-century American politicians
Simpson Thacher & Bartlett
Urban Institute people
Recipients of the Four Freedoms Award
Yale College alumni
Yale Bulldogs men's ice hockey players
Members of the American Philosophical Society
Special Envoys of the Secretary-General of the United Nations
Lawyers from Clarksburg, West Virginia